Events in the year 1891 in Norway.

Incumbents
Monarch – Oscar II
Prime Minister –

Events

 The 1891 Parliamentary election takes place.

Arts and literature
Tired Men (or Weary Men) by Arne Garborg is published.

Births

January to March
8 January – Hans Gabrielsen, county governor of Finnmark and Oppland (died 1965)
10 January – Sig Haugdahl, motor racing driver in America (died 1970)
17 January – Astrid Skare, politician (died 1963)
9 February – Kristian Krefting, footballer, military officer, chemical engineer and company owner (died 1964).
16 February – Håkon Endreson, gymnast and Olympic silver medallist (died 1970)
24 February – Theo Findahl, teacher and journalist (died 1976).
27 February – Johannes Stubberud, newspaper editor (died 1942)
6 March – Herman Smitt Ingebretsen, politician (died 1961)
8 March – Robert Sjursen, gymnast and Olympic gold medallist (died 1965)
17 March – Claus Høyer, rower and Olympic bronze medallist (died 1923)
23 March – Jens Olai Steffensen, politician (died 1961)

April to June
 

5 April – Per Severin Hjermann, politician (died 1972)
28 April – Isak Abrahamsen, gymnast and Olympic gold medallist (died 1972)
11 May – Gerda Ring, actress (died 1999).
15 May – Halfdan Jønsson, trade unionist (died 1945).
20 May – Per Skou, international soccer player (died 1962)
28 May – Anders Jahre, shipping magnate (died 1982)
30 May – August Schønemann, singer, actor and comedian (died 1925).
8 June – Bjarne Pettersen, gymnast and Olympic gold medallist

July to September
3 July – Birger Brodtkorb, track and field athlete (died 1935)
3 July – Erling Jensen, gymnast and Olympic bronze medallist
6 July – Conrad Olsen, rower and Olympic bronze medallist (died 1970)
21 July – Ingvar Wedervang, economist and statistician (died 1961)
28 July – Anders Endreson Skrondal, politician (died 1968)
16 August – Henry Larsen, rower and Olympic bronze medallist
18 August – Mons Arntsen Løvset, politician (died 1972)
4 September – Alfred Sigurd Nilsen, politician (died 1977)
8 September – Martin Smeby, politician (died 1975)
9 September – Johan Lauritz Eidem, politician (died 1984)
20 September – Kristen Gundelach, poet (died 1971).
22 September – Klara Amalie Skoglund, politician (died 1978)

October to December
6 October – Olaf Hovdenak, long distance runner (died 1929)
25 October – Ola Olsen, politician (died 1973)
17 November – Sigurd Christiansen, novelist and playwright (died 1947)
20 November – Einar Berntsen, sailor and Olympic bronze medallist (died 1965)
14 December – Thor Ørvig, sailor and Olympic gold medallist (died 1965)
14 December – Sverre Reiten, politician (died 1965)

Full date unknown
Birger Bergersen, politician and Minister (died 1977)
Ludvig G. Braathen, shipping and airline magnate (died 1976)
Hans Julius Gabrielsen, politician (died 1965)
Toralv Øksnevad, politician, journalist, newspaper editor and radio personality (died 1975)
Julius Sundsvik, novelist and newspaper editor (died 1971)

Deaths

23 March – Mads Langaard, brewery owner and industrialist (born 1815).
23 April – Harald Ulrik Sverdrup, priest and politician (born 1813)
23 June – Frederik Christian Stoud Platou, politician (born 1811) 
13 July – Jens Holmboe, politician and Minister (born 1821)

Full date unknown
Halvor Olaus Christensen, politician (born 1800)
Daniel Otto Isaachsen, businessperson and politician (born 1806)

See also

References